Mirjalal Ghaffarzadeh Mansour  (10 January 1930 – 11 November 2012) more known as Jalal Mansouri was an Iranian weightlifter. He competed at the 1952 Summer Olympics and the 1956 Summer Olympics.

References

1930 births
2012 deaths
Iranian male weightlifters
Olympic weightlifters of Iran
Weightlifters at the 1952 Summer Olympics
Weightlifters at the 1956 Summer Olympics
Place of birth missing
Asian Games gold medalists for Iran
Asian Games silver medalists for Iran
Asian Games medalists in weightlifting
Weightlifters at the 1951 Asian Games
Weightlifters at the 1958 Asian Games
Medalists at the 1951 Asian Games
Medalists at the 1958 Asian Games
World Weightlifting Championships medalists
20th-century Iranian people